Premier Motorcycles were British motorcycles manufactured by a business founded as a bicycle manufacturer by W. H. Herbert and William Hillman in 1876. Their "Hillman and Herbert Cycle Company" was renamed "Premier Cycle Co." in 1891.

White & Poppe engine
Their first motorcycle was produced in 1908, with a White & Poppe side-valve engine and Chater-Lea front forks. They made their first V-twin in 1909, followed by a 499 cc single-cylinder machine in 1910.

The business changed its name to "The Premier Cycle Company (Coventry Premier Ltd.)" in 1914.

After the First World War bicycle or motorcycle production was not resumed and the cyclecar business was acquired by Singer Motors in 1921 although Premier motorcycles were produced under licence in Czechoslovakia throughout the 1930s.

Models

External links

References

 

Motorcycle manufacturers of the United Kingdom
Defunct motor vehicle manufacturers of England